Storo (Stòr in local dialect) is a comune (municipality) in Trentino in the northern Italian region Trentino-Alto Adige/Südtirol, located about  southwest of Trento.

The municipality of Storo contains the frazioni (subdivisions, mainly villages and hamlets) Darzo, Lodrone and Riccomassimo.

Storo borders the following municipalities: Condino, Bagolino, Brione, Ledro and Bondone.

Population

Gallery

References

External links
 Homepage of the city

Cities and towns in Trentino-Alto Adige/Südtirol